Dental floss is a cord of thin filaments used in interdental cleaning to remove food and dental plaque from between teeth or places a toothbrush has difficulty reaching or is unable to reach. Its regular use as part of oral cleaning is designed to maintain oral health.

Use of floss is recommended to prevent gingivitis and the build-up of plaque. The American Dental Association claims that up to 80% of plaque can be removed by flossing, and it may confer a particular benefit in individuals with orthodontic devices. However, empirical scientific evidence demonstrating the clinical benefit of flossing as an adjunct to routine tooth brushing alone remains limited.

A Japanese macaque and long-tailed macaques have been observed in the wild and in captivity flossing with human hair and feathers.

History

Levi Spear Parmly (1790-1859), a dentist from New Orleans, is credited with inventing the first form of dental floss. In 1819, he recommended running a waxen silk thread "through the interstices of the teeth, between their necks and the arches of the gum, to dislodge that irritating matter which no brush can remove and which is the real source of disease." He considered this the most important part of oral care. Floss was not commercially available until 1882, when the Codman and Shurtleft company started producing unwaxed silk floss. In 1898, the Johnson & Johnson Corporation received the first patent for dental floss that was made from the same silk material used by doctors for silk stitches.

One of the earliest depictions of the use of dental floss in literary fiction is found in James Joyce's famous novel Ulysses (serialized 1918–1920), but the adoption of floss was low before World War II. During the war, nylon floss was developed by physician Charles C. Bass. Nylon floss was found to be better than silk because of its greater abrasion resistance and ability to be produced in great lengths and at various sizes.

Floss became part of American and Canadian daily personal dental care routines in the 1970s.

Use
Dental professionals recommend that a person floss once per day before or after brushing to reach the areas that the brush will not and allow the fluoride from the toothpaste to reach between the teeth.  Floss is commonly supplied in plastic dispensers that contain 10 to 100 meters of floss. After pulling out approximately 40 cm of floss, the user pulls it against a blade in the dispenser to cut it off. The user then strings the piece of floss on a fork-like instrument or holds it between their fingers using both hands with about 1–2 cm of floss exposed. The user guides the floss between each pair of teeth and gently curves it against the side of the tooth in a 'C' shape and guides it under the gumline. This removes particles of food stuck between teeth and dental plaque that adhere to dental surfaces below the gumline.

Types
Various dental flosses are commonly used in many forms, including waxed, unwaxed monofilaments and multifilaments. Dental floss that is made of monofilaments coated in wax slides easily between teeth, does not fray and is generally higher in cost than its uncoated counterparts.  The most important difference between available dental flosses is thickness.  Waxed and unwaxed floss are available in varying widths. Studies  have shown that there is no difference in the effectiveness of waxed and unwaxed dental floss, but some waxed types of dental floss are said to contain antibacterial agents and/or sodium fluoride.  Factors to consider in choosing a floss include the amount of space between teeth and user preference. Dental tape is a type of floss that is wider and flatter than conventional floss. Dental tape is recommended for people with larger tooth surface area.

The ability of different types of dental floss to remove dental plaque does not vary significantly; the least expensive floss has essentially the same impact on oral hygiene as the most expensive.

Factors to be considered when choosing the right floss or whether the use of floss as an interdental cleaning device is appropriate may be based on:
The tightness of the contact area: determines the width of floss
The contour of the gingival tissue
The roughness of the interproximal surface
The user's manual dexterity and preference: to determine if a supplemental device is required

Specialized plastic wands, or floss picks, have been produced to hold the floss. These may be attached to or separate from a floss dispenser. While wands do not pinch fingers like regular floss can, using a wand may be awkward and can also make it difficult to floss at all the angles possible with regular floss. These types of flossers also run the risk of missing the area under the gum line that needs to be flossed. On the other hand, the enhanced reach of a wand can make flossing the back teeth easier.

Dental floss is the most frequently recommended cleaning aid for teeth sides with a normal gingiva contour in which the spaces between teeth are tight and small. The dental term ‘embrasure space’ describes the size of the triangular-shaped space immediately under the contact point of two teeth. The size of the embrasure space is useful in selecting the most appropriate interdental cleaning aid. There are three interproximal embrasure types or classes as described below:

Type I – the gums fills embrasure space completely
Type II – the gums partially fills embrasure space
Type III – the gums do not fill embrasure space

The table below describes the types of interdental non-powered self-care products available.

The table below describes the different types of Interdental powered self-care products available.

Efficacy

Evidence
The American Dental Association has stated that flossing in combination with tooth brushing can help prevent gum disease and halitosis.

However, evidence favoring commonplace use of floss remains limited. A 2008 systematic review concluded that adjunct flossing was no more effective than tooth brushing alone in reducing plaque or gingivitis. The authors concluded that routine instruction of flossing in gingivitis patients as helpful adjunct therapy is not supported by scientific evidence, and that flossing recommendations should be made by dental professionals on an individual basis.

A 2011 Cochrane Database systematic review identified "some evidence from 12 studies that flossing in addition to tooth brushing reduces gingivitis compared to tooth brushing alone", and "weak, very unreliable evidence from 10 studies that flossing plus tooth brushing may be associated with a small reduction in plaque at 1 and 3 months." Studies of flossing behavior are based on self-report and many people do not floss properly. A 2006 review of 6 studies in which professionals flossed the teeth of school children over a period of 1.7 years showed a 40% reduction in the risk of tooth decay.

More recently, a 2019 Cochrane Database systematic review compared toothbrushing alone to interdental cleaning devices, and also compared flossing to other interdental cleaning methods. In all, 35 randomized control trials met the criteria for inclusion, with all but 2 studies at high risk for performance bias. The authors concluded that “overall, the evidence was low to very low certainty, and the effect sizes observed may not be clinically important.”

As many authors note, the efficacy of flossing may be highly variable based on individual preference, technique, and motivation. Moreover, flossing may be a relatively more difficult and tedious method of interdental cleaning compared to an interdental brush.

Exclusion from US Dietary Guidelines in 2015
There was a controversy when the 2015 United States Dietary Guidelines for Americans did not include a recommendation about flossing. The U.S. Department of Health and Human Services and the U.S. Department of Agriculture publish Dietary Guidelines for Americans every five years.  Guidelines published in 2000, 2005 and 2010 recommended flossing as part of a combined approach to preventing dental diseases. The 2010 Guidelines mention flossing once in 95 pages, in 2005 the word also appears once in 71 pages and it appears twice in the 38-page 2000 document.

In August 2016, an Associated Press (AP) article titled "Medical benefits of dental floss unproven" reported on the omission of flossing from the 2015 document. The article tied the omission to the AP's Freedom of Information Request to the departments of Health and Human Services and Agriculture where it asked for the scientific evidence behind the Guidelines’ flossing recommendation noting that “The guidelines must be based on scientific evidence, under the law.” The story was picked up by other news organizations including The New York Times in an article entitled "Feeling Guilty About Not Flossing? Maybe There’s No Need".

The American Dental Association contacted the U.S. Department of Health and Human Services about the omission and reported that the omission of the flossing recommendation was due to the fact that the Dietary Guidelines chose to focus on diet and that the omission was not because the Department questions the efficacy of flossing. As reported by Medscape

A website managed by a maker of dental floss referred to the entire episode as "Flossgate".

Floss for orthodontic appliances
Orthodontic appliances, such as brackets, wires, and bands, can harbor plaque with more virulent changes in bacterial composition, which can ultimately cause a reduction in periodontal health as indicated by increased gingival recession, bleeding on probing, and plaque retention measurements. Furthermore, fixed appliances makes plaque control more challenging and restricts the natural cleaning action of the tongue, lips, and cheek to remove food and bacterial debris from tooth surfaces, and also creates new plaque stagnation areas that stimulate the colonisation of pathogenic bacteria.Patients undergoing orthodontic treatment may be recommended to maintain a high level of plaque control through not only conscientious toothbrushing, but also proximal surface cleaning via interdental aids, with dental floss being the most recommended by dental professionals. Notably, small-scale clinical studies have demonstrated that dental floss, when used correctly, may lead to clinically significant improvements in proximal gingival health.

Floss threader
A floss threader is loop of fiber that is shaped in order to produce better handling characteristics. It is (similar to fishing line) used to thread floss into small, hard to reach sites around teeth. Threaders are sometimes required to floss with dental braces, fix retainers, and bridge.

Floss pick
 

A floss pick  is a disposable oral hygiene device generally made of plastic and dental floss. The instrument is composed of two prongs extending from a thin plastic body of high-impact polystyrene material.  A single piece of floss runs between the two prongs.  The body of the floss pick generally tapers at its end in the shape of a toothpick.
There are two types of angled floss picks in the oral care industry, the Y-shaped angle and the F-shaped angle floss pick. At the base of the arch where the "Y" begins to branch there is a handle for gripping and maneuvering before it tapers off into a pick.

Floss picks are manufactured in a variety of shapes, colors and sizes for adults and children. The floss can be coated in fluoride, flavor or wax.

History of floss pick
In 1888, B.T. Mason wrapped a fibrous material around a toothpick and dubbed it the "combination tooth pick." In 1916, J.P. De L'eau invented a dental floss holder between two vertical poles. In 1935, F.H. Doner invented what today's consumer knows as the Y-shaped angled dental appliance. In 1963, James B. Kirby invented a tooth-cleaning device that resembles an archaic version of today's F-shaped floss pick.

In 1972, an inventor named Richard L. Wells found a way to attach floss to a single pick end. In the same year, another inventor named Harry Selig Katz came up with a method of making a disposable dental floss tooth pick.

Environmental Impact
It’s estimated that the yearly production of almost 5 billion single-use flossers for North America emits about 10,000 metric tons of carbon dioxide equivalents per year. This results in 10 million pounds of plastic trash entering the North American environment every year.

See also

 Oral irrigator
 Tongue cleaner
 Chlorhexidine
 Mouthwash
 Xylitol
 Sugar-free gum
 Electric toothbrush

References

External links
“Medical Benefits of Dental Floss Unproven” (Aug. 2, 2016).
Oral-B Glide dental floss may expose people to harmful chemicals Harvard T.H. Chan School of Public Health

Dental equipment
Oral hygiene
American inventions
19th-century inventions